Transmembrane protein 201 is a protein that in humans is encoded by the TMEM201 gene.

References

Further reading